Thagadooru  is a village in the southern state of Karnataka, India. It is located in the Nanjangud taluk of Mysore district.

Demographics
 India census, Thagadooru had a population of 7280 with 3600 males and 3680 females.

See also
 Mysore
 Districts of Karnataka

References

External links

Villages in Mysore district